Wheat is a surname. Notable people with the surname include:

Alan Wheat (born 1951), American politician
Brian Wheat (born 1963), American musician
DeJuan Wheat (born 1973), American basketball player
Ken Wheat (born 1950), American screenwriter, film producer and director
Larry Wheat (1876–1963), American character actor
Lloyd F. Wheat (1923–2004), American politician and lawyer
Mark Wheat, English-born American DJ
Mike Wheat (born 1947), American judge
Natasha Wheat (born 1981), American artist
Sara Wheat (born 1984), American figure skater
Sheila D. Wheat, American singer